Microman/Micro Man (born September 30, 1998) is the ring name of a Mexican masked professional wrestler (luchador enmascarado in Spanish), and is currently under contract with Major League Wrestling and Lucha Libre AAA Worldwide (AAA).

He previously worked for the Mexican professional wrestling promotion Consejo Mundial de Lucha Libre (CMLL). Microman has dwarfism and competed in CMLL's little people-exclusive Micro-Estrellas ("Micro Stars") division. He is the son of KeMonito, also a little person, who works as a mascota in CMLL. His real name is not a matter of public record, as is often the case with masked wrestlers in Mexico where their private lives are kept concealed from wrestling fans.

Microman's debut on April 30, 2017, also marked the debut of the CMLL Micro-Estrellas division, with Microman being one of the featured performers in the group of little people. He won his first Lucha de Apuestas, mask vs, mask match, at the CMLL 86th Anniversary Show when he defeated and unmasked Chamuel.

Personal life
Microman was born on September 30, 1998, in Mexico City, Mexico, the son of professional wrestling mascota KeMonito (real name not revealed). Growing up he idolized Mascarita Dorada, who, unlike his father, was an active professional wrestler, despite his dwarfism.

He initially studied computer science in school but stopped to begin training for a professional wrestling career. When he was old enough to start training Microman asked his father for permission to train to be a wrestler, which in turn led KeMonito to ask his longtime friend Último Guerrero, head trainer at CMLL's wrestling school, to train his son. Guerrero initially expressed concerns as there were no other similarly sized wrestlers training at the school at that time. After being convinced of Microman's dedication he finally agreed to train him for an in-ring career.

Professional wrestling career

Consejo Mundial de Lucha Libre (2017–2021)
At the time Microman completed his training CMLL did not have any other active little people wrestlers, but decided to have several of their mascotas as well as little people wrestlers from the independent circuit, join a newly created "Micro-Estrellas" (Micro Stars) division. Microman and El Gallito defeated Zacarías el Perico and Cuije in the first-ever Micro-Estrellas match at one of CMLL's "Kids' day" shows. As part of the division, CMLL also hired a Micro-Estrella referee. While most matches in CMLL were best-two-out-of-three falls matches, the early Micro-Estrella matches were one fall, but later moved to the traditional two-out-of-three falls format. Microman and the Micro-Estrellas would appear on various CMLL shows, as well as make special appearances on the Mexican independent circuit, such as The Crash Lucha Libre, Promociones El Cholo, or Desastre Total Ultraviolento.

For the first anniversary of the Micro-Estrellas division, CMLL held an eight-micros torneo cibernetico elimination match, featuring the entire active Micro-Estrella division at the time. Microman teamed up with Atomo, Guapito, and Zacarías to take on Angelito, Chamuel, El Gallito, and Mije. In the end Microman pinned Chamuel to win the tournament. Following the anniversary Microman and Chamuel began a long-running storyline feud, which often saw Chamuel either tear Microman's mask open or steal it during a match. The Micro-Estrellas made their debut at a major CMLL show on November 11, 2018, when Microman, Atomo, and Gallito defeated Chamuel, Mije, and Zacarías two falls to one on the Día de Muertos show. The Microman/Chamuel feud led to the first one-on-one match in the Micro division on August 30, 2019, as part of CMLL's International Gran Prix. The match ended in a disqualification as Chamuel was disqualified for throwing his mask to Microman in an attempt to fool the referee. The feud between the two led to a Lucha de Apuestas, mask vs. mask match, between the two as part of the CMLL 86th Anniversary Show. The match was the first time in 32 years that two "Micros" had a Lucha de Apuestas match. Microman won the third and deciding fall, forcing Chamuel to unmask and reveal his real name per lucha libre traditions. With the success of the Micro-Estrellas, CMLL introduced the CMLL World Micro-Estrellas Championship in December 2019. Microman and five other Micro-Estrellas (Chamuel,  Atomo, Gallito, Guapito, and Zacarías) were involved in the elimination match to determine the first champion on December 25. In the end Chamuel pinned Microman to eliminate him and win the championship. In November 2021, Microman announced his departure from CMLL.

Independent circuit (2017–present)
While working for CMLL, Microman, like all CMLL workers, is allowed to take independent circuit bookings on days he is not needed by CMLL. Microman's independent circuit appearances usually sees him team with and face off against other CMLL Micro-Estrellas. His first non-CMLL match was on June 14, 2017, at a Promociones El Cholo show in Tijuana, Baja California which saw Microman and El Gallito defeat Mije and Zacarías by disqualification. On September 15, 2018, Microman, and Gallito defeated Chamuel and Zacarías in a match at the Benito Juarez ExpoMuseo in Mexico City. The Micro-Estrellas also competed at Desastre Total Ultraviolento's 11th Anniversary Show, which featured Microman and Gallito defeating Mije and Zacarías. They also made a special appearance for The Crash Lucha Libre, one of Mexico's largest independent promotions, with Microman and Gallito once again defeating Chamuel and Zacarías in their March 2, 2019 match. For the 2020 Homenaje a Mr. Niebla show on January 4, 2020, Zacarías, dressed like the recently deceased Mr. Niebla, defeated Microman.

Reception
Microman was voted the first runner up for the 2017 Wrestling Observer Newsletter Rookie of the Year award, second to only Katsuya Kitamura. While the CMLL 86th Anniversary Show in general was given mediocre reviews the match between Microman and Chamuel was well received. Richard Gallegos of the Voices of Wrestling stated that "Microman and Chamuel saved the night with their fantastic Apuestas Match", and a Cageside Seats review named the match the "match of the night". CBS News described Microman as the "pequeña gran estrella de la Lucha Libre,", or "Little big star of professional wrestling" in a 2018 article. Súper Luchas magazine described his, and the Micro Estrellas debut, as "an encounter with a fall that literally stole the night."

Championships and accomplishments
Consejo Mundial de Lucha Libre
Primero Aniversario de Micro-Estrella torneo cibernetico
Lucha Libre AAA Worldwide
Copa Triplemanía XXX: Monterrey

Luchas de Apuestas record

Footnotes

References

1998 births
Living people
Micro-Estrella wrestlers
Mexican male professional wrestlers
Masked wrestlers
Unidentified wrestlers
Professional wrestlers from Mexico City